Shobdo Jobdo is a Bengali web series streaming on Bengali OTT platform hoichoi from 21 February 2020. Directed by Saurav Chakraborty who previously directed two series for hoichoi, Dhanbad Blues and Cartoon. The series is going to be a thriller story. Featuring Rajat Kapoor who is going to make his debut in Bengali web series through Shobdo Jobdo. The series also starring Payel Sarkar, Subrat Dutta & Mumtaz Sorcar.

Plot 
The story features Sougata Sinha, a US-based fiction writer of several bestsellers. Amid his return to Kolkata and the promotional drive of his next novel, he is confronted by a girl, his supposed ex-girlfriend, who had committed suicide many years ago. Is he the prey to this mysterious woman's conspiracy - or is it his imagination? To get over the uneasiness caused by the mystery woman's revelations and subsequent blackmailing. Sougata decides to head on a trip. However, the atmosphere turns murkier around the resort he lives. As a series of scandalous truths are set to be revealed.

Cast 
Rajat Kapoor as Sougata Sinha
Payel Sarkar as Aditi
Mumtaz Sorcar as Sulagna
Subrat Dutta as Dr. Amitabha Mitra
Saloni Pandey as Raka
Kankana Chakraborty

Episodes

Season 1 (2020)
On 21 February 2020 the season 1 of the series released with seven episodes.

Episodes

Release
On 26 January Hoichoi released the teaser of Shobdo Jobdo and created a hype among the audience. hoichoi released the series on 21 February 2020.

References

External links

Bengali-language web series
Hoichoi original programming